The Type 024 missile boat is a Chinese built small missile boat armed with two anti-ship missiles. Two versions were developed.  Although most have been placed in reserve, dozens remain in active service.  Those in active service have been rearmed with C-101 supersonic anti-ship missiles.

Heku class
The Heku class is the major version of Type 024 missile boat and it is also known as Hegu class, Hoku class, Hogu class, Hougu class and Houku class, depending on spelling and pronunciation. This class is the Chinese steel-hulled improvement over the original wooden-hulled Soviet .  The boat was designed by the 701st Institute at Wuhu while the missile launcher was designed by the 713th Institute.  Since the delivery of the first unit by Wuhu Shipyard, around 80 were built in total, including export units. Ten of the Heku-Class were exported to Iran.

Homa class
In addition to the development of the Heku class missile boat, another single unit of Type 024 missile boat with hydrofoils was also developed.  This boat is called Homa class missile boat, but the design proved to be less satisfactory, and after serving in the People's Liberation Army Navy for evaluation, the unit was retired.

References

Missile boat classes
Missile boats of the Soviet Union
Missile boats of the People's Liberation Army Navy